The 2013 Southern Jaguars football team represented Southern University in the 2013 NCAA Division I FCS football season. The Jaguars were led by first year head coach Dawson Odums, who was made the new head coach he served serving as interim head coach for the final nine games of the previous season. The Jaguars played their home games at Ace W. Mumford Stadium and were a member of the West Division of the Southwestern Athletic Conference (SWAC). The Jaguars finished the season with a  record, as West Division Champions and with a victory over Jackson State in the SWAC Championship Game.

Schedule

^Games will air on a tape delayed basis

Media
All Southern Jaguars football games were broadcast on KQXL-FM 106.5 with Chris Powers (play-by-play), Gerald Kimble (analyst), and Eric Randall (sideline) calling the Jaguar Action. All home games will also been televised tape delayed by Cox Sports, usually on Sunday nights.

References

Southern
Southern Jaguars football seasons
Southwestern Athletic Conference football champion seasons
Southern Jaguars football